Perry Barr Urban District, or Urban District of Perry Barr was an area of England for local government administrative purposes. As such, it was administered locally by Perry Barr Urban District Council. It took its name from the included hamlet of Perry Barr, which was until then in the parish of Handsworth. It was created in 1894 as a result of the Local Government Act 1894, as a subdivision of the administrative county of Staffordshire, and  existed until 1928, when it largely became part of Birmingham, and so also part of the county of Warwickshire. At that time, small parts of the district were granted to the Royal Town of Sutton Coldfield, also in Warwickshire, and to West Bromwich (remaining in Staffordshire until 1974). In 1974, Birmingham was taken out of Warwickshire and became part of the West Midlands county, as was Sutton Coldfield, which became part of Birmingham at the same time.

The district included areas which today are known as:

 Perry Barr
 (Old) Oscott
 Queslett
 Hamstead
 Handsworth (parts of)
 Great Barr (parts of)

The area is still considered to be in the Staffordshire vice-county for wildlife recording purposes.

References 

 Population statistics:

External links 

 Perry Barr UD boundary map at Vision of Britain

Districts of England created by the Local Government Act 1894
Urban districts of England
History of Staffordshire
History of Birmingham, West Midlands
Perry Barr